is a former Japanese football player. His elder brother Koji is also a former footballer.

Playing career
Yoshimura was born in Sakawa, Kochi on August 8, 1979. After graduating from Aichi Gakuin University, he joined J1 League club Nagoya Grampus Eight (later Nagoya Grampus) in 2002. He became a regular player as defensive midfielder in 2003 and played many matches for a long time. In 2009, Grampus won the 2nd place in Emperor's Cup. Although his opportunity to play decreased from 2010, Grampus won the champions in 2010 J1 League first J1 League champions in the club history. In 2013, he moved to J2 League club Ehime FC which he played for the youth team. He played many matches as defensive midfielder. However he could not play many matches in 2015 and retired end of 2015 season.

Club statistics

References

External links

1979 births
Living people
Aichi Gakuin University alumni
Association football people from Kōchi Prefecture
Japanese footballers
J1 League players
J2 League players
Nagoya Grampus players
Ehime FC players
Association football midfielders